John Morton (26 July 1914 – 8 March 1986), better known as Jackie Morton, was an English professional footballer who played as a forward in the Football League for West Ham United.

Morton made 275 appearances and scored 57 goals for the East London club until 1939, having signed from Gainsborough Trinity for £600 in 1931. Along with Joe Cockroft, he was an ever-present for the club during the 1933–34 season.

Morton had previously played for Woodburn Council School and Woodhouse Alliance, and signed pro with Gainsborough aged 17.

He gained a solitary cap for England in a 5–4 victory over Czechoslovakia on 1 December 1937, in which he scored the second England goal (Stanley Matthews scored his only international hat trick in this match).

References

External links

1914 births
1986 deaths
Footballers from Sheffield
English footballers
England international footballers
Association football forwards
West Ham United F.C. players
English Football League players
English Football League representative players